Lowellville Junior/Senior High School is a public high school in Lowellville, Ohio, United States. It is the only high school in the Lowellville Local School District. Its athletic teams are called the Rockets, and they compete in the Ohio High School Athletic Association as a member of the Mahoning Valley Athletic Conference.

Notable alumni 
 Jennifer Walcott, glamour model and actress
 Kelly Pavlik, former professional boxer

References

External links 
 

High schools in Mahoning County, Ohio
Public high schools in Ohio